Poul Christiansen (30 October 1897 – 31 July 1968) was a Danish footballer. He played in one match for the Denmark national football team in 1925.

References

External links
 

1897 births
1968 deaths
Danish men's footballers
Denmark international footballers
People from Frederiksberg
Association football goalkeepers
Boldklubben af 1893 players